Pedro Lobo (born 1954, in Rio de Janeiro) is a Brazilian photographer. He currently lives in Portugal.

Biography 
Lobo has exhibited his work in Brazil, Denmark, Germany, Colombia and in the United States. His interest in popular architecture as a construction of human individuality has led him to photograph slums (or favelas) and prisons such as the one in Sao Paulo known as Carandiru (later demolished). The latter pictures were shown in the exhibition Imprisoned spaces/Espaços aprisionados at Blue Sky Gallery, in Portland, Oregon, in 2005.

His first one-man show in Portugal was Favelas: Architecture of Survival at Museu Municipal Prof. Joaquim Vermelho in 2009 in Estremoz, later exhibited in Galeria 3+1 in Lisbon.

In 2010, the Art Institute of Charleston partnered with the Halsey Institute of Contemporary Art at the College of Charleston and the City of Charleston Office of Cultural Affairs to bring Lobo to Charleston, South Carolina as their first international artist in residence. Lobo presented several lectures to Art Institute of Charleston photography students and took them on a guided tour of his solo exhibition at The City Gallery at Waterfront Park.

In 2011, his latest series on contemporary religion In Nomine Fidei was shown at Hellerau Festspielhaus, in Dresden, Germany.

Lobo has taken part in other exhibitions such as REtalhar2007 in Centro Cultural do Banco do Brasil in Rio de Janeiro and Via BR 040 – Serra Cerrado, with Miguel Rio Branco, Elder Rocha, etc. in Plataforma Contemporânea of the Museu Imperial of Petropolis, in 2004 and 2005.

Lobo, a Fulbright scholar, has studied photography at the school of the Boston Museum of Fine Arts de with Elaine O'Neil and Bill Burke and at New York's International Center of Photography (ICP). From 1978 to 1985 he worked for the Brazilian Landmark Commission (Fundação Pró-Memória) as a photographer and researcher.
In 2008 he was awarded the first prize at Tops Festival in China.

References

Bibliography
BISILLIAT, Maureen (org.) "Aqui dentro, páginas de uma memória: Carandiru" São Paulo: Imprensa Oficial do Estado de São Paulo: Fundação Memorial da América Latina, 2003, pg. 259
MAGALHÃES, Angela e Nadja Fonseca Peregrino "Fotografia no Brasil", Rio de Janeiro: Funarte, 2004. , pg. 352 e 353
FONSECA, Nicky Baendereck Coelho e Nirlando Beirão "Rio/Sao: doze visões de duas cidades maravilhosas", São Paulo: Formarte, 2003.
RAUSCHENBERG, Christopher "Blue Sky 05/06", Portland:Oregon Center for the Photographic Arts, 2006 , pg. 91 a 95
revista PHOTO MAGAZINE, ano 4, n, 21, agosto setembro 2008, pg. 26
GUERREIRO, Hugo "Favelas: Arquitectura da sobrevivência - fotografias de Pedro Lobo", Estremoz: Camara Municipal de Estremoz, 2009.
RICHA, Arnaldo Chain (org.) "O Pão de Açucar de cada vida" Rio de Janeiro: Oficina da Festa, 1999. 
ZIFF, Trisha "Che Guevara: revolutionary & icon" New York: Abrams Image, fotografia pg. 64

External links
Hellerau - http://www.hellerau.org/english/calendar/auf-der-suche-nach-dem-wunderbaren/in-nomine-fidei/
Halsey Institute of Contemporary Art http://halsey.cofc.edu/exhibitions/travelingEX/index.php
Prison Photography http://prisonphotography.wordpress.com/2010/09/06/pedro-lobo-records-the-vestiges-of-carandiru-of-creativity-in-adversity/
Charleston The Digitel http://charleston.thedigitel.com/arts-culture/artist-lecture-pedro-lobo-favelas-architecture-sur-24153-0930
Charleston City Paper http://www.charlestoncitypaper.com/charleston/brazilian-photographer-digs-into-rios-shantytowns/Content?oid=2394316

Brazilian photographers
1954 births
Living people